Robert Chazan is the S.H. and Helen R. Scheuer Professor of Hebrew & Judaic Studies at New York University.

According to  Andrew Gow writing in Speculum, Chazan is, "a distinguished scholar in the field of Jewish history and Christian-Jewish relations in the high Middle Ages."

A festschrift published in Chazan's honor and edited by David Engel, Lawrence Schiffman, Elliot Wolfson, and Yechiel Schur, lists, "the history of the Jewish communities in Western Christendom during the Middle Ages, Jewish-Christian interactions in medieval Europe, medieval Jewish Biblical exegesis and religious literature, and historical representations of the experience of medieval Jewry," as 4 of the scholarly concerns that have been central to Chazan's work.

Bibliography

The Trial of the Talmud: Paris, 1240 (Pontifical Institute of Mediaeval Studies, 2012)
Reassessing Jewish Life in Medieval Europe (Cambridge University Press, 2010)

Fashioning Jewish Identity in Medieval Western Christendom (Cambridge: Cambridge University Press, 2004)
God, Humanity, and History: The Hebrew First-Crusade Narratives (Berkeley and Los Angeles: University of California Press, 2000)
Medieval Stereotypes and Modern Antisemitism (Berkeley and Los Angeles: University of California Press, 1997)
 
 
Daggers of Faith: Thirteenth-Century Christian Missionizing and Jewish Response (Berkeley and Los Angeles: University of California Press, 1989)
 

 
Medieval Jewry in Northern France (Baltimore: Johns Hopkins University Press, 1974)

Awards 
1988: National Jewish Book Award in Jewish History for European Jewry and the First Crusade

References

American medievalists
Place of birth missing (living people)
Living people
New York University faculty
Fellows of the Medieval Academy of America
1936 births
Columbia College (New York) alumni
Jewish Theological Seminary of America alumni
Columbia Graduate School of Arts and Sciences alumni